Valayesh (also Romanized as Vālāyesh; also known as Vilaish and Vilashi) is a village in Sonbolabad Rural District, Soltaniyeh District, Abhar County, Zanjan Province, Iran. At the 2006 census, its population was 890, in 224 families.

References 

Populated places in Abhar County